Ericameria albida is a North American species of flowering shrub in the family Asteraceae known by the common name white flowered rabbitbrush. It is native to desert regions in the western United States mostly in the Great Basin (Utah, Nevada, and eastern California (Inyo, Mono, and San Bernardino Counties; one report of it in Lassen County is from an urban area).

Ericameria albida grows in dry, alkaline plains in desert regions. The tips of its erect branches hold dense inflorescences of tiny flower heads with creamy white disci florets but no ray florets.

References

albida
Flora of the Great Basin
Flora of California
Flora of Nevada
Plants described in 1882
Flora without expected TNC conservation status